The 1974 Peach Bowl was a college football bowl game between the Texas Tech Red Raiders and the Vanderbilt Commodores at Atlanta–Fulton County Stadium in Atlanta, Georgia. Texas Tech represented the Southwest Conference (SWC) and Vanderbilt represented the Southeastern Conference (SEC) in the competition. The game was the final competition of the 1974 football season for each team and resulted in a 6–6 tie.

Background
Texas Tech entered the game with a 6–4–1 record and had been ranked most of the season, rising as high as #9 in the AP Poll during the season.  Losses in Texas Tech's final two regular season games bumped them out of the poll.  Vanderbilt entered the game with a 7–3–1 record, closing their regular season with a tie against rival Tennessee. This was their first bowl game since 1955.

Game summary
Neither team scored in the first quarter.  Vanderbilt led 3–0 at halftime thanks to a 31-yard field goal kicked with ten minutes left in the second quarter.

With three minutes left in the third quarter the Red Raiders drove to the Vanderbilt 16 yard line but only got 3 points out of the drive on a 26-yard field goal.  Texas Tech then attempted another field goal after a Vanderbilt fumble but the attempt was blocked.

In the fourth quarter Vanderbilt retook the lead, 6–3, after a 26-yard field goal.  Texas Tech responded with a 35-yard field goal with two minutes left in the game.  Vanderbilt could not turn its final possession into a score and the game ended in a 6–6 tie.

Texas Tech finished with 19 first downs to Vanderbilt's 10 and with 306 yards of rushing offense to Vanderbilt's 140.

Statistics

Sources
 Phil Steele's SEC Football 2009 Preview, p. 49

References

Peach Bowl
Peach Bowl
Texas Tech Red Raiders football bowl games
Vanderbilt Commodores football bowl games
Peach Bowl
December 1974 sports events in the United States